Systemic juvenile idiopathic arthritis (or the juvenile onset form of Still's disease) is a type of juvenile idiopathic arthritis (JIA) with extra-articular manifestations like fever and rash apart from arthritis. It was originally called systemic-onset juvenile rheumatoid arthritis or Still's disease.

Predominantly extra-articular manifestations like high fevers, rheumatic rash, enlargement of the liver and spleen, enlargement of the lymph nodes, and anemia. Other manifestations include inflammation of the pleura, inflammation of the pericardium, inflammation of the heart's muscular tissue, and inflammation of the peritoneum are also seen. It is sometimes called "juvenile-onset Still's disease" to distinguish it from adult-onset Still's disease. However, there is some evidence that the main difference between two conditions is the age of onset.

Presentation
Systemic JIA is characterized by arthritis, fever, which typically is higher than the low-grade fever associated with polyarticular and a salmon pink rash. It accounts for 10-20% of JIA and affects males and females equally, unlike the other two subtypes of JIA, and affects adolescents. It generally involves both large and small joints. Systemic JIA can be challenging to diagnose because the fever and rash come and go. Fever can occur at the same time every day or twice a day (often in late afternoon or evening) with a spontaneous rapid return to baseline (vs. continuous fever of septic arthritis). The rash often occurs with fever. It is a discrete, salmon-pink macules of different sizes.  It migrates to different locations on skin, rarely persisting in one location more than one hour. The rash is commonly seen on trunk and proximal extremities or over pressure areas.

Arthritis is often absent in the first weeks or even 6–8 months into the illness. Systemic JIA may have internal organ involvement such as hepatosplenomegaly, lymphadenopathy, serositis, hepatitis, or tenosynovitis.

Cause
The cause is unknown but it's thought to be related to environmental, genetic, and hormonal factors.

A polymorphism in macrophage migration inhibitory factor has been associated with this condition.

Diagnosis
Rheumatoid factor and ANA tests are generally negative in systemic JIA.
Lab findings: anemia of chronic disease (can also appear in non-systemic types), neutrophilia, thrombocytosis, elevated acute phase reactants (ESR, CRP, ferritin).

Treatment
Treatment with either glucocorticoids, methotrexate, anakinra, or tocilizumab has been examined. Anakinra has been shown to resolve the clinical features of the disease in 87% of patients. It also induces remission in half of corticosteroid-resistant patients. The results of another study were similar, with half of the patients responding to treatment with Anakinra.  Canakinumab, an antibody to
interleukin-1 beta, is indicated for treatment in patients who respond poorly to other treatments.

Prognosis
25% of cases progress to severe destructive arthritis. In the United States, mortality is estimated at 4%  and in Europe, mortality is estimated at 21.7%.

History
Still's disease is named after English physician Sir George Frederic Still (1861–1941). It was characterized by EG Bywaters in 1971.

References

External links 

Arthritis
Pediatrics
Rheumatology
Connective tissue diseases
Inflammatory polyarthropathies
Idiopathic diseases
Rare diseases